Fahri Asiza (born Mohammad Fahri), is an Indonesian novelist and teacher.

He has written approximately fifty-two novels; his works include books for children and adults. His best-selling book is Shakila (novel), which sold about 100,000 copies. In 2004 he published Kekasih rembulan.

References

External links
 

Year of birth missing (living people)
Living people
Indonesian male writers
Indonesian male novelists
Place of birth missing (living people)